The Oil Sharks is a 1933 German drama film directed by Rudolph Cartier and Henri Decoin and starring Arlette Marchal, Vivian Grey and Gabriel Gabrio. It is the French-language version of Invisible Opponent, made with the same crew but a largely different cast and some alterations to the story line. The sets for both films were designed by the art director Erwin Scharf.

Cast
In alphabetical order
 Raoul Aslan as Delmonde
 Raymond Cordy as Hans Mertens
 Gabriel Gabrio as James Godfrey
 Jean Galland as Pierre Ugron
 Vivian Grey as Eve Ugron
 Peter Lorre as Henry Pless
 Arlette Marchal as Jeannette
 Robert Ozanne as Santos

References

Bibliography

External links 
 

1933 films
German drama films
1933 drama films
1930s French-language films
Films directed by Rudolph Cartier
Films directed by Henri Decoin
Films set in South America
German multilingual films
Films about con artists
German black-and-white films
1933 multilingual films
1930s German films